Erika Hansson (born 2 July 1973) is a Swedish former alpine skier who competed in the 1994 Winter Olympics. She is the older sister of fellow alpine skier Martin Hansson.

References

External links
 sports-reference.com

1973 births
Swedish female alpine skiers
Alpine skiers at the 1994 Winter Olympics
Olympic alpine skiers of Sweden
Living people
People from Hedemora